The black-headed python (Aspidites melanocephalus) is a species of snake in the Pythonidae (the python family). The species is endemic to Australia. No subspecies are currently recognized.

Description
 
 
The body is muscular with a flattened profile, while the tail tapers to a thin point.

The top of the head is covered by large, symmetrical scales. The dorsal scales, which are smooth and glossy, number 50-65 rows at midbody, while  315-355 ventral scales occur. The tail has 60-75 mainly single subcaudal scales and the anal scale is single. The posterior subcaudals tend to be divided, often irregularly.

The color pattern consists of shades of black, dark grey, brown, gold, and cream arranged in a banded or brindled pattern. The belly is light-colored, flecked with darker spots. The head is shiny black that also extends down the neck and throat for several inches.

Distribution and habitat
The species A. melanocephalus is found in Australia, in the northern half of the country, excluding the very arid regions. The type locality given is "Port Denison Bowen", Queensland, Australia. It occurs in humid tropical to semiarid conditions.

Behavior
A. melanocephalus is terrestrial and is often found amongst rocks and loose debris. If disturbed, it hisses loudly, but is unlikely to bite unless hunting prey. It sometimes strikes with a closed mouth, but generally can be handled easily. It is a strong swimmer, but is almost never found in water. it is not venomous.

Feeding
The diet of A. melanocephalus consists mainly of reptiles, including snakes, but it will eat mammals if available. Because the black-headed python lives in the tropics, it heats up quicker and stays warmer for longer. This means it can eat more because it digests food quicker in warmer conditions. When ingesting large prey, this species positions one or two coils just ahead of its distended mouth and by constriction makes the task of swallowing easier.

Reproduction
A. melanocephalus is oviparous. Adult females lay five to 10 eggs per clutch. The females stay coiled about the eggs and incubate them until they hatch, which is usually after 2–3 months. The young take small prey as soon as two days after hatching. Immature individuals are vulnerable to predation, including cannibalism. Adults have no natural predators other than dingos and humans.

Captivity
Due to its docile nature and striking color pattern, A. melanocephalus has become very desirable as an exotic pet. It is bred in captivity and can be relatively easily obtained, but does command a high price. As it can be a muscular snake and reaches a fairly substantial size, prospective owners should consider a suitable enclosure, as well as temperature and feeding requirements.

In human culture
A. melanocephalus is mentioned in, or plays a central role in, the stories of the Indigenous Australians Dreamtime tradition.

References

Further reading
Boulenger GA (1893). Catalogue of the Snakes in the British Museum (Natural History). Volume I., Containing the Families ... Boidæ .... London: Trustees of the British Museum (Natural History). (Taylor and Francis, printers). xiii + 448 pp. + Plates I–XXVIII. (Aspidites melanocephalus, p. 91).
Cogger HG (2014). Reptiles and Amphibians of Australia, Seventh Edition. Clayton, Victoria, Australia: CSIRO Publishing. xxx + 1,033 pp. .
Krefft G (1864). "Description of Aspidiotes melanocephalus, a New Snake from Port Denison, N.E. Australia". Proceedings of the Zoological Society of London 1864: 20-22.
Wilson S, Swan G (2013). A Complete Guide to Reptiles of Australia, Fourth Edition. Sydney: New Holland Publishers. 522 pp. .

External links

 Black-headed Python video Accessed 30 June 2013
 
 The Creation Story of the Wardaman People at Renewing Women's Business. Accessed 19 September 2007.
 Black-Headed Python at Zoos Victoria. Accessed 19 September 2007.
 Aspidites melanocephalus at Python Pete Reptiles. Accessed 19 September 2007.

Pythonidae
Reptiles of Western Australia
Taxa named by Gerard Krefft
Reptiles described in 1864
Snakes of Australia